Nicoleta Căruțașu (née Vornicu on 14 February 1964) is a retired Romanian runner. She specialized in the 400 metres hurdles event, in which she won silver medals at the 1987 and 1991 Universiades. She also competed at the 1992 Summer Olympics, but failed to reach the final.

References

1964 births
Living people
Romanian female hurdlers
Olympic female hurdlers
Olympic athletes of Romania
Athletes (track and field) at the 1992 Summer Olympics
Universiade medalists in athletics (track and field)
Universiade silver medalists for Romania
World Athletics Championships athletes for Japan